Pedro Hernández may refer to:
Pedro Hernández (sculptor) (died 1665), Spanish sculptor
Pedro Hernández (infielder) (born 1959), former third baseman
Pedro Hernández (fencer) (born 1955), Cuban Olympic fencer
Pedro Hernández (pitcher) (born 1989), Major League Baseball pitcher
Pedro Hernández Calderón (born 1981), football goalkeeper
Pedro Hernández de Córdova, Spanish soldier
Pedro Hernández Martínez (born 1978), Spanish football defender
Pedro Hernandez (murderer), convicted of kidnapping and murdering Etan Patz
Pedro Hernández Franco (born 1993), Mexican footballer
Pedro Hernández (soccer) (born 1999), American soccer player
Pablo Hernández (footballer, born 1986) (Pedro Pablo Hernández), Argentine-born Chilean footballer